Dehagh (also known as Dehaq) is a city in Mehrdasht District, in Najafabad County, Isfahan province, Iran.  At the 2006 census, its population was 7,828, in 2,174 families.

References

Populated places in Najafabad County

Cities in Isfahan Province